Disney Sing It: Pop Hits is a karaoke video game released on October 6, 2009, across multiple platforms.

It's the fourth game in the Disney Sing It series. The game features songs from Disney-affiliated artists and Disney Channel productions like Hannah Montana, Camp Rock, Demi Lovato, Vanessa Hudgens and the Jonas Brothers. It also features a selection of songs from non-Disney artists like Taylor Swift, Coldplay and Duffy and a "Singing lessons" mode with a virtual vocal coach.

It was followed by a fifth game, Disney Sing It: Party Hits.

Songs 
Disney Sing It: Pop Hits features a number of songs by Disney-affiliated artists as well as Disney Channel related shows and films such as Hannah Montana, High School Musical 3, Camp Rock Cast (Demi Lovato and the Jonas Brothers) and popular songs heard on Radio Disney.

Track list

See also
High School Musical: Sing It!
Disney Sing It
Disney Sing It! – High School Musical 3: Senior Year
Disney Sing It: Party Hits
Disney Sing It: Family Hits

External links 
 Sing It Official mini-site
 Gamezone

2009 video games
Disney video games
Sing It!
Karaoke video games
Multiplayer and single-player video games
PlayStation 2 games
PlayStation 3 games
Video games developed in the United Kingdom
Wii games
Zoë Mode games
Radio Disney